The GER Class T77 was a class of twenty-five 0-6-0 steam locomotives designed by A. J. Hill for the Great Eastern Railway. They all passed to the London and North Eastern Railway at the 1923 grouping and received the classification J19.

History
These locomotives were a development of the GER Class E72, and shared the same  cylinders,  wheels, and Belpaire firebox-fitted boiler. Changes included vacuum brakes from new, and the abandonment of cylinder tail rods.

All were still in service at the 1923 grouping, the LNER adding 7000 to the numbers of nearly all the ex-Great Eastern locomotives, including the Class T77 locomotives. The rebuilt locomotives were reclassified J19/2, while the yet-to-be rebuilt locomotives reclassified J19/1. The J19/2 classification also included the rebuilt former Class E72 locomotives.

At nationalisation in 1948, British Railways added 60000 to their LNER numbers. They all continued in service until 1959, when the first was withdrawn; all were gone by the end of 1962.

References

External links

  – Great Eastern Railway Society
 The Hill J18 & J19 (GER Classes E72 & T77) 0-6-0 Locomotives – LNER Encyclopedia

T77
0-6-0 locomotives
Railway locomotives introduced in 1916
Standard gauge steam locomotives of Great Britain
Scrapped locomotives
Freight locomotives